Alanna Larissa Santana de Carvalho (born 10 March 1990), simply known as Alanna, is a Brazilian footballer who plays as an attacking midfielder.

Club career
Born in Salvador, Bahia, Alanna began his career at local side São Francisco. In 2010, after impressing with the under-20 national team, she moved to Ferroviária.

Alanna subsequently played for Duque de Caxias, São José-SP and Kindermann before returning to São Francisco in 2014. She returned to São José in the following year before signing a contract with Corinthians for the 2017 season.

Alanna moved to Santos in 2018, being a regular starter before suffering a knee injury which kept her sidelined for more than a year.

International career
Alanna represented Brazil at under-20 level in the 2010 South American U-20 Women's Championship and the 2010 FIFA U-20 Women's World Cup, being the top goalscorer of the former tournament with seven goals.

Honours

Club
São José-SP
Copa Libertadores Femenina: 2013
Campeonato Paulista de Futebol Feminino: 2015

Santos
Campeonato Paulista de Futebol Feminino: 2018
Copa Paulista de Futebol Feminino: 2020

International
Brazil
South American U-20 Women's Championship: 2010

References

1990 births
Living people
Sportspeople from Salvador, Bahia
Brazilian women's footballers
Women's association football midfielders
Campeonato Brasileiro de Futebol Feminino Série A1 players
Associação Ferroviária de Esportes (women) players
São José Esporte Clube (women) players
Sport Club Corinthians Paulista (women) players
Santos FC (women) players